COPERT 

is an MS Windows software program aiming at the calculation of air pollutant emissions from road transport. The technical development of COPERT is financed by the European Environment Agency (EEA), in the framework of the activities of the European Topic Centre on Air and Climate Change. Since 2007, the European Commission's Joint Research Centre has been coordinating the further scientific development of the model. In principle, COPERT has been developed for use from the National Experts to estimate emissions from road transport to be included in official annual national inventories. 
The COPERT methodology is also part of the EMEP/CORINAIR Emission Inventory Guidebook. The Guidebook, developed by the UNECE Task Force on Emissions Inventories and Projections, is intended to support reporting under the UNECE Convention on Long-Range Transboundary Air Pollution and the EU directive on national emission limits. The COPERT methodology is fully consistent with the Road Transport chapter of the Guidebook. The use of a software tool to calculate road transport emissions allows for a transparent and standardized, hence consistent and comparable data collecting and emissions reporting procedure, in accordance with the requirements of international conventions and protocols and EU legislation.

Features 
 Calculation of Emissions from Road Transport
 Compilation of an emission inventory
 Calculation for different vehicle categories (passenger cars, light duty vehicles, heavy duty vehicles, mopeds and motorcycles)
 Pollutants covered:
 major air pollutants (CO, NOx, VOC, PM, NH3, SO2, heavy metals)
 greenhouse gas emissions (CO2, N2O, CH4)

History
Version History

 COPERT 5 version 4.36 – October 2020
 COPERT 5 version 4.30 – September 2020
 COPERT 5 version 3.26 – May 2020
 COPERT 5 version 3.23 – May 2020
 COPERT 5 version 3.0 – September 2019
 COPERT 5 version 2.2 - February 2019
 COPERT 5 version 2.1 - November 2018
 COPERT 5 version 2.0 - August 2018
 COPERT 5 version 1.1 - December 2017
 COPERT 5 version 0.1145 - May 2017
 COPERT 5 version 0.1067 - October 2016
 COPERT 5 version 0.1039 - September 2016
 COPERT 4 version 11.4 - September 2016
 COPERT 4 version 11.3 - June 2015
 COPERT 4 version 11.2 - January 2015
 COPERT 4 version 11.0 - September 2014
 COPERT 4 version 10.0 - November 2012
 COPERT 4 version 9.1 - August 2012
 COPERT 4 version 9.0 - October 2011
 COPERT 4 version 8.1 - May 2011
 COPERT 4 version 8.0 - October 2010
 COPERT 4 version 7.1 - March 2010
 COPERT 4 version 7.0 - December 2009
 COPERT 4 version 6.1 - February 2009
 COPERT 4 version 6.0 - December 2008
 COPERT 4 version 5.1 - February 2008
 COPERT 4 Version 5.0 - December 2007
 COPERT 4 Version 4.0 - October 2007
 COPERT 4 Version 3.0 - November 2006
 COPERT 4 Beta Version 2.0.0 - July 2006
 COPERT 4 Beta Version 1.4 - March 2006
 COPERT 4 Beta Version 1.0 - Dec 2005
 COPERT III Final Version 2.3 - July 2002

See also 
 Emission Inventory
 Handbook Emission Factors for Road Transport (HBEFA)

Notes

External links 
 COPERT Documentation
 COPERT
 European Environment Agency - EEA
 Joint Research Centre - JRC
 EMEP/CORINAIR Emission Inventory Guidebook
 Task Force on Emission Inventories and Projections - TFEIP

Business software for Windows